Christian Iván Villanueva Limón (born June 19, 1991), nicknamed "Villa", is a Mexican professional baseball third baseman for the Sultanes de Monterrey of the Mexican League. He previously played in Major League Baseball (MLB) for the San Diego Padres and in Nippon Professional Baseball (NPB) for the Yomiuri Giants and Hokkaido Nippon-Ham Fighters. Villanueva won the National League's Rookie of the Month Award for April 2018.

Career

Minor leagues
Villanueva signed with the Texas Rangers as an international free agent on August 17, 2008. He missed the part of the 2009 season after having knee surgery. The Rangers traded Villanueva and Kyle Hendricks to the Chicago Cubs in 2012 in exchange for Ryan Dempster.

By 2014, Villanueva was blocked in the Cubs' organization by fellow third baseman Kris Bryant. Villanueva broke his right fibula during spring training in 2016 and missed the entire season. He was non-tendered on December 2.

San Diego Padres
On December 12, 2016, Villanueva signed a minor league contract with the San Diego Padres.
Villanueva began the 2017 season with the El Paso Chihuahuas of the Class AAA Pacific Coast League. He batted .296 with 20 home runs. On September 18, 2017, the Padres promoted Villanueva to the major leagues. He made his major league debut that day, starting at third base. He batted .344 in 32 at bats for the Padres.

On April 3, 2018, Villanueva hit three home runs in a game against the Colorado Rockies at Petco Park. He was named the National League Rookie of the Month for the month of April 2018. In April he led all rookies in hits, runs scored, home runs, RBI, batting average, on-base percentage, slugging and total bases. In May 2018 he tied the MLB record for most home runs for a rookie born in Mexico. On August 22, Villanueva fractured his finger while fielding 2nd base and missed the remainder of the season.

On November 6, 2018, Villanueva signed with the Yaquis de Obregon of the Mexican Pacific League for the 2018 winter season.

Yomiuri Giants
On November 20, 2018, the Padres designated Villanueva for assignment and sold his contract to the Yomiuri Giants of Nippon Professional Baseball's Central League. The next day, he officially signed to a one-year, $3.6;million contract with the Giants. On December 2, 2019, he become free agent.

Hokkaido Nippon-Ham Fighters
On December 5, 2019, Villanueva signed with the Hokkaido Nippon-Ham Fighters. On December 2, 2020, he became a free agent.

Sultanes de Monterrey
On April 6, 2021, Villanueva signed with the Sultanes de Monterrey of the Mexican League.

Personal life
Villanueva and his wife had a son, Christian Jr., in 2017.

References

External links

1991 births
Living people
Arizona League Rangers players
Daytona Cubs players
Dominican Summer League Rangers players
Mexican expatriate baseball players in the Dominican Republic
El Paso Chihuahuas players
Hickory Crawdads players
Hokkaido Nippon-Ham Fighters players
Iowa Cubs players
Major League Baseball players from Mexico
Major League Baseball third basemen
Mexican expatriate baseball players in Japan
Mexican expatriate baseball players in the United States
Myrtle Beach Pelicans players
National baseball team players
Nippon Professional Baseball third basemen
San Diego Padres players
Sportspeople from Guadalajara, Jalisco
Sultanes de Monterrey players
Tennessee Smokies players
Yaquis de Obregón players
Yomiuri Giants players
2019 WBSC Premier12 players